Independent Schools Football Association (ISFA) oversees football in independent schools in the United Kingdom. The ISFA is affiliated to the Football Association.

The chairman is current Headmaster of Hampton School Kevin Knibbs.

History
Dick Sale, headmaster of Brentwood School and public school representative on the F.A. Council, formed the Public Schools Football Association and was its first chairman. The name was changed to the Independent Schools FA in 1986 under the chairmanship of Chris Saunders, headmaster of Eastbourne College and later Lancing College. In 2005, the Independent Schools Football Association for Girls division was formed. The current chairman is the third person to hold that post.

Boodles ISFA Cup
The association organises the Boodles ISFA Cup, a knockout competition among ISFA member schools. The final usually takes place at a Football League ground, with recent finals taking place at the Stadium MK, home ground of Milton Keynes Dons.

Previous winners are:

Note that the 2020-21 tournament was not played due to the Covid-19 Pandemic.

ISFA U15 Cup

In season 2007–08 two new cup competitions were introduced: the Investec ISFA Under-15 Cup and the Investec ISFA U13 Cup. The finals for both of these competitions have so far taken place at Burton Albion F.C.

Investec ISFA Under-15 Cup Winners:

Note that the Final (Royal Russell School vs Whitgift School) of the 2019-20 tournament and the whole of the 2020-21 tournament were not played due to the Covid-19 Pandemic.

Other Competitions

Investec ISFA Under-13 Cup Winners:

Note that the Final (Aldenham School vs Manchester Grammar School) of the 2019-20 tournament and the whole of the 2020-21 tournament were not played due to the Covid-19 Pandemic.

The organisation also organises football in Independent Schools for Girls, and runs an Under 18 Cup competition for girls.

ISFA Under-18 Girls Cup winners:

ISFA Accredited Competitions 
ISFA is accredited with these competitions:

The HUDL Independent Schools League is a league consisting of the following schools: Ardingly College, Bede's School, Bradfield College, Hampton School, Millfield School, Repton School, Royal Russel School, Shrewsbury School.

The Southern Independent Schools Lent Term League is a league run in the Lent Term consisting of the following schools: Berkhamsted School, Epsom College, Haileybury School, Harrow School, Radley College, St John's, Leatherhead, St Paul's School, Tonbridge School.

The London Independent Schools Cup is a knockout competition between 1st and 2nd XI sides from select independent schools based in London; the final 32 is the first round of the cup.

Other competitions include: Birkdale U13 North-East Tournament, Mercian Independent Schools League, South-East Girls U15 Tournament, Thames Valley League, Barry Burns Northern Eights, Thomas' Five-A-Side Football Tournaments, etc.

Representative teams

ISFA also organises teams to represent Independent Schools in England at Under-14, Under-15, Under-16 and Under-18 levels. The Under-18 and Under-16 sides undertake an annual overseas tour, as well as numerous fixtures, including an annual Under-18 fixture against Scotland Independent Schools. The Under-14 and Under-15 sides play matches mainly against academy teams from various English professional clubs.

Notable former players
Olly Lee – Brentwood School
Elliot Lee – Brentwood School
Frank Lampard – Brentwood School
Max Kretzschmar – Hampton School
James Beattie – QEGS Blackburn
Quinton Fortune – Forest School
Nedum Onuoha – Hulme Grammar School
Dan Harding – St. Bede's School, Hailsham
Neil Mellor – St Bede's College, Manchester
Adam Virgo – Ardingly College
Andy Frampton – Lancing College
Neil Harris – Brentwood School
Chris Porter – QEGS Blackburn
Robin Shroot – Alleyn's School
Lawrie Wilson – Millfield
Fraser Forster – Royal Grammar School, Newcastle
Jordan Spence – Chigwell School
Josh O'Keefe – QEGS Blackburn
Frank Fielding – QEGS Blackburn
Will Hughes – Repton School
Johnny Gorman – Repton School
Duncan Watmore – Cheadle Hulme
Solomon March – St. Bede's School, Hailsham

References

External links
Independent Schools Football Association

County football associations